Monroe Township is one of thirteen townships in Fremont County, Iowa, United States.  As of the 2010 census, its population was 230 and it contained 99 housing units.

History
Monroe Township was organized in 1855.

Geography

Cities, towns, villages
 Imogene

Cemeteries
The township contains Monroe Cemetery and Mount Calvary Cemetery.

Transportation
 U.S. Route 59

School districts
 Farragut Community School District
 Fremont-Mills Community School District
 Shenandoah Community School District

Political districts
 Iowa's 3rd congressional district
 State House District 23
 State Senate District 12

References

External links
 City-Data.com

Townships in Iowa
Townships in Fremont County, Iowa